Night and the City is a 1950 British film directed by Jules Dassin.

Night and the City may also refer to:

 Night and the City (1992 film), an American remake of the 1950 film, by Irwin Winkler
 Night and the City (album), a 1996 album by Charlie Haden and Kenny Barron
 Night and the City (novel), a 1938 novel by Gerald Kersh
 "Night and the City" (The Batman), a 2005 television episode

See also
 Night in the city (disambiguation)
 City of Night (disambiguation)
 Night city (disambiguation)